Sochchora albipunctella is a moth of the family Pterophoridae. It is known from Brazil.

The wingspan is 13–15 mm. Adults are on wing in January.

External links

Pterophorinae
Moths described in 1911
Moths of South America